The 1989 Giro di Lombardia was the 83rd edition of the Giro di Lombardia cycle race and was held on 14 October 1989. The race started in Como and finished at the Piazza del Duomo in Milan. The race was won by Tony Rominger of the Chateau d'Ax team.

General classification

References

1989
1989 in road cycling
1989 in Italian sport
1989 UCI Road World Cup
October 1989 sports events in Europe